is a Japanese visual effects artist, television producer, director, screenwriter, and actor. He won the Director of the Year and Screenplay of the Year awards at the Japan Academy Film Prize in 2006 for Always: Sunset on Third Street. He is a member of the animation and visual effects studio Shirogumi.

Filmography

Films
 Juvenile (2000)
 Returner (2002)
 Always: Sunset on Third Street (2005)
 Always: Sunset on Third Street 2 (2007)
 Ballad (2009)
 Space Battleship Yamato (2010)
 Friends: Naki on Monster Island (2011)
 Always: Sunset on Third Street 3 (2012)
 The Eternal Zero (2013)
 Stand by Me Doraemon (2014)
 Parasyte: Part 1 (2014)
 The Fighter Pilot (2014)
 Parasyte: Part 2 (2015)
 Fueled: The Man They Called Pirate (2016)
 Destiny: The Tale of Kamakura (2017)
 The Great War of Archimedes (2019)
 Dragon Quest: Your Story (2019)
 Lupin III: The First (2019)
 Stand by Me Doraemon 2 (2020)
 Ghost Book (2022)
 Untitled Toho Godzilla film (2023)

Original video animations
 BALDR FORCE EXE Resolution (2006 - 2007)

Commercials
Lotte: Airs (2006)

Music videos
Bump of Chicken: "Namida no Furusato" (2006)
Bump of Chicken: "Good Luck" (2012)

Theme park attraction
 Godzilla the Ride: Giant Monsters Ultimate Battle - Seibu-en (2021)

Video games
"Onimusha 3: Demon Siege" (Opening CG movie director) (2004)
http://onimusha.garyoutensei.com/oni3/staff/yamasaki.htm

References

External links
 

Japan Academy Prize for Director of the Year winners
Japanese film directors
1964 births
Living people
People from Matsumoto, Nagano